Chica is a given name, surname and nickname. Notable people known by this name include the following:

Nickname, pen name or stage name
 Francisca Chica da Silva (c. 1732–1796), Brazilian born slave
Ada Jane Chica Macnab and later as Ada Munro, Scottish artist
Chica Paula Schopf, Chilean electronic music producer and DJ
Chica Umino, pen name of an anonymous Japanese manga artist
 Francisca Chica Xavier (1932–2020), Brazilian actress and producer
Nhá Chica, actual named Francisca de Paula de Jesus (1810 – 1895), Brazilian Roman Catholic religious figure

Given name
Chica Sato, Japanese musician and fashion model

Middle name
 Fernando Chica Arellano (born 1963), Spanish Roman Catholic priest and diplomat of the Holy See

Surname

Chica
 Javi Chica (born 1985), Spanish footballer
 Jorge Chica (1952–2020), Ecuadorian footballer and neurosurgeon
 Patricia Chica, Canadian film and television director, producer and writer

De Chica and De La Chica
 Olga de Chica (1921–2016), Colombian neo-primitivist painter
 Julian De La Chica, Colombian composer, pianist, and record producer

See also

 Chia (surname)
 Chiba (surname)
 Chic (nickname)
 Chica (disambiguation)
 Chick (nickname)
 Chick (surname)
 Chicka (disambiguation)
 Chickie (nickname)
 Chida (surname)
 Chika (general name)
 Chika (Igbo given name)
 Chika (Japanese given name)